Telmana is a rural locality (a logging depot settlement) in Tosnensky District of Leningrad Oblast, Russia, located almost adjacent to the municipal city of Kolpino on the territory of the federal city of St. Petersburg. Population:  

With the expansion of Kolpino, Kolpino buildings are increasingly pushing into the borders of Telmana.

References

Rural localities in Leningrad Oblast